Gridley is a city in Butte County, California, United States,  south of Chico, California and  north of Sacramento, California. The 2019 State of California population estimate was 7,224. California State Route 99 runs through Gridley and Interstate 5 and California State Route 70 are both nearby. The highway CA 99 goes through Gridley and the current population is 9,082 [found in a recent census].

History
Butte County was historically a bountiful area covered with oak trees, fields of manzanita brush, and marshes and lakes in the rainy season. The valley floor abounded with wild game, geese and ducks overhead, deer, antelope, tule elk, the coyote, and many smaller varieties of animal life. Fish swarmed in the rivers and creeks. Several tribal groups, including the Maidu people, were settled in the region when they were first encountered by Spanish and Mexican scouting expeditions in the early 18th century. In the 1850s George W. Gridley, a wool grower and grain farmer who at the time was one of the largest landowners in Butte County, settled a 960-acre home ranch west of the town site that was to be named after him. Gridley was established in 1870 when the Oregon and California Railroad was constructed north from Marysville. The railroad reached Chico on July 2, 1870.

In response to a "The Place Where Crops Never Fail" advertising campaign by the California Irrigated Land Company, members of The Church of Jesus Christ of Latter-day Saints began emigrating from the Rexburg, Idaho area to Gridley in November 1906. By February of the following year the Gridley Branch of the church was organized and more Latter-day Saints continued coming to Gridley from Idaho, Nevada, Utah and other states, effectively turning this small farming community into a Mormon enclave. By the end of 1908 there were some 500 LDS settlers in the Gridley area and their first chapel was constructed on the west corner of Sycamore and Vermont Streets in 1912 with a seating capacity of 1,000—the largest LDS meetinghouse west of Salt Lake City at that time.

Following a fire in November 2018 in Paradise, California, 400 temporary modular housing units called the "Gridley Camp Fire Community" were erected at a city-owned industrial park in Gridley.

In 2020, Gridley was the place where former NASA engineer and YouTube star Mark Rober achieved a world record of the World's Largest Elephant's Toothpaste Explosion with a height of 60 feet, before subsequently breaking the record again with a height of 250 feet in 2021.

Geography

Climate
According to the Köppen climate classification system, Gridley has a warm-summer Mediterranean climate, abbreviated "Csa" on climate maps.
<div style="width:65%">

</div style>

Demographics

2010
The 2010 United States Census reported that Gridley had a population of 6,584. The racial makeup of Gridley was 4,283 (65.1%) White, 55 (0.8%) African American, 98 (1.5%) Native American, 249 (3.8%) Asian, 3 (0.0%) Pacific Islander, 1,552 (23.6%) from other races, and 344 (5.2%) from two or more races. Hispanic or Latino of any race were 3,000 persons (45.6%).

The Census reported that 6,472 people (98.3% of the population) lived in households, 16 (0.2%) lived in non-institutionalized group quarters, and 96 (1.5%) were institutionalized. There were 2,183 households, out of which 910 (41.7%) had children under the age of 18 living in them, 1,087 (49.8%) were opposite-sex married couples living together, 338 (15.5%) had a female householder with no husband present, 134 (6.1%) had a male householder with no wife present. There were 149 (6.8%) unmarried opposite-sex partnerships, and 8 (0.4%) same-sex married couples or partnerships. 520 households (23.8%) were made up of individuals, and 297 (13.6%) had someone living alone who was 65 years of age or older. The average household size was 2.96. There were 1,559 families (71.4% of all households); the average family size was 3.54.

The population was spread out, with 1,892 people (28.7%) under the age of 18, 668 people (10.1%) aged 18 to 24, 1,681 people (25.5%) aged 25 to 44, 1,415 people (21.5%) aged 45 to 64, and 928 people (14.1%) who were 65 years of age or older. The median age was 33.1 years. For every 100 females, there were 94.3 males. For every 100 females age 18 and over, there were 91.6 males.

The homeowner vacancy rate was 2.6%; the rental vacancy rate was 6.5%. 3,829 people (58.2% of the population) lived in owner-occupied housing units and 2,643 people (40.1%) lived in rental housing units.

Economy 
Gridley is adjacent to the Sacramento metropolitan area, the fifth largest metropolitan area in California.

Tourism

The Gridley area is a sportsman's haven. Excellent hunting, fishing and naturalist opportunities are available on private and public lands. Its 8,400 acres form some of the most intensively used and developed wetlands in the entire Pacific Flyway.
Lake Oroville and the Oroville Afterbay feed into the clear rolling waters of the Feather River, which provides some of the best salmon fishing in the state. The Oroville Dam is one of the 20 largest dams in the world, the largest earth filled dam in the US, and the tallest dam in the US. Lake Oroville has 15,500 surface acres for recreation and 167 miles of shoreline. Lake Oroville features an abundance of camping, picnicking, horseback riding, hiking, sail and power boating, water-skiing, fishing, swimming, boat-in camping, floating campsites and horse camping. At the base of the Dam, the Feather River Fish Hatchery raises Chinook salmon and steelhead along the Feather River.
Lake Oroville Visitor Center is located in Kelly Ridge and overlooks the Oroville Dam and Lake Oroville. The visitor center is home to a museum with interpretive displays, the history of the dam and the State Water Project. A 47-foot viewing tower also allows the visitor the opportunity to have a panoramic view of the lake and surrounding areas.

Parks and recreation 

Gridley has several trails and parks featuring playgrounds, picnic tables and benches. Boat Launch Park includes a new boat ramp and dock, restrooms, lighting, and a fish cleaning table. The modern facility was largely funded by the California Division of Boating and Waterways.

Education
The Gridley Community is served by the Gridley Unified School District.  Schools in the Gridley Unified School District include:
 Gridley High School
 Esperanza High School
 Sycamore Middle School
 McKinley Elementary School
 Wilson Elementary School
 Manzanita Elementary School

Higher education
California State University, Chico (Chico State)
Butte College
Yuba Community College
Cal Northern School of Law

Infrastructure

Healthcare
Orchard Hospital is a general acute care facility in Gridley with a Level IV trauma center and standby emergency care.

Highways
It is close to larger metropolitan areas. California State Route 70 and Interstate 5 are both within .

Public transport
B-Line Butte Regional Transit is Butte County's regional public transit system. Area residents use B-Line to travel locally in Gridley, Chico, Oroville, and Paradise, or to travel between communities throughout Butte County.

Airport 
Southwest Airlines currently accounts for half the airline passengers. The Airport served more than 10 million passengers in 2016.

Notable people

 G. Vernon Bennett, Los Angeles City Council member, 1935–49
 Isaac Austin, retired NBA basketball player, 1991–2004
 Wally Westlake, MLB All-Star baseball player
 Leslie Deniz, Olympic silver medal, 1984 Los Angeles, Women's discus

References

External links
 
 City-Data.com Comprehensive Statistical Data and more about Gridley

 
Cities in Butte County, California
Incorporated cities and towns in California